Bucculatrix carolinae is a moth in the family Bucculatricidae and was first described by Annette Frances Braun in 1963. It is found in North America, where it has been recorded from South Carolina.

References

Natural History Museum Lepidoptera generic names catalog

Bucculatricidae
Moths described in 1963
Moths of North America
Taxa named by Annette Frances Braun